John Littlewood may refer to:

John Edensor Littlewood (1885–1977), British mathematician
John Littlewood (chess player) (1931–2009), British chess player